Tim and Tom were an American comedy duo made up of Tim Reid and Tom Dreesen. DuPont marketing manager Reid and insurance salesman Dreesen met at a Junior Chamber of Commerce meeting near Chicago  in 1968.  They were "put together to promote an anti-drug program in the local schools" and, prompted by a comment from a child, decided to form a comedy team.  The team, later billed as "Tim & Tom", was the first interracial comedy duo (Reid is African-American and Dreesen is white).  Years later, Reid and Dreesen co-wrote a book about those years called Tim & Tom: An American Comedy in Black and White (co-written with sports writer Ron Rapoport).

A 1970 Jet article stated that the comedy duo were good examples of racial cooperation and had received national attention "in persuading young people against the use of drugs".

References

External links 

American comedy troupes
American comedy duos